Qezel Bolagh (also Romanized as Qezel Bolāgh) is a village in Qaflankuh-e Sharqi Rural District, Kaghazkonan District, Meyaneh County, East Azerbaijan Province, Iran. At the 2006 census, its population was 70, in 20 families.

References 

Populated places in Meyaneh County